Stadionområdet (The stadium district) is an area in Malmö, Sweden. The area is the home of two major stadiums, an ice hockey arena, an indoors arena, and several training facilities for association football, ice hockey and track and field sports.

Venues

Training facilities
The area features several training facilities for numerous sports. Most notably the area features five football fields that are located south of Stadion. Two of these fields are fitted with artificial turf and located on the south side of Stadiongatan from the rest of the area. The fields are primarily used by Malmö FF, IFK Malmö, and various minor football clubs. Indoor football facilities are located in Kombihallen, which is located southeast of Stadion. Kombihallen is used by Malmö FF during the colder periods of the year when outdoor training is complicated due to snowfall.

References

External links

 

Sport in Malmö
Stadionområdet
Malmö FF
Neighbourhoods of Malmö